Mark Borisovich Mitin (Russian: Марк Борисович Митин) (born: Mark Borisovich Gershkovich: 5 July 1901 – 15 January 1987 ) was a Soviet Marxist-Leninist philosopher and university lecturer, Professor of Philosophy Faculty of Moscow State University (1964–1968, 1978–1985 ). He was interested primarily dialectical and historical materialism, the philosophy of history and criticism of "bourgeois" philosophy.

Biography
He came from a Jewish working-class family. In the years 1925-1929 he studied philosophy at the Institute of Red Professors, which had the responsibility for educating a new Soviet intelligentsia. Mitin became a member of the Russian Communist Party (Bolsheviks) in 1919. In the years 1939-1961 he was a member of the Central Committee of the Communist Party of the Soviet Union and during the period 1950-1962 deputy of the Supreme Soviet of the USSR. From 1944 to 1950 he served on the editorial board of the journal Bolshevik (Большевик). From 1939, for five years he was director of the Institute of Marxism-Leninism of the CPSU Central Committee.

New philosophy
In the 1920s a debate raged within Soviet Dialectical Materialism between the Mechanists and the Dialecticians of the Deborin School. Deborin was initially victorious, but he was criticized by Mitin for "Menshevizing idealism." Mitin led the Red Professors in ousting Deborin. Mitin insisted that Deborin lacked Party Spirit and did not recognize the unity of theory and praxis.

References

1901 births
1987 deaths
20th-century Russian philosophers
Materialists
Marxist theorists
Russian communists
Russian Marxists
Soviet philosophers
Institute of Red Professors alumni